Padre Abad is the smallest of four provinces in the Ucayali Region, in the central Amazon rainforest of Peru.

Languages
According to the 2007 census, 89.4% of the population spoke Spanish as their first language, while 6.3% spoke Quechua, 0.1% spoke Asháninka, 0.1% spoke Aymara, 3.9% spoke other indigenous languages and 0.0% spoke foreign languages.

Political division
The province is divided into three districts, each of which is headed by a mayor (alcalde). The districts, with their capitals in parenthesis, are:

 Curimaná (Curimaná)
 Irazola (San Alejandro)
 Padre Abad (Aguaytía)

Provinces of the Ucayali Region